The 1982 Avon Championships of Cincinnati  was a women's tennis tournament played on indoor carpet courts at the Riverfront Coliseum in Cincinnati, Ohio in the United States that was part of the 1982 Avon Championships Circuit. It was the third, and last, edition of the tournament and was held from January 11 through January 17, 1982. Fifth-seeded Barbara Potter won the singles title and earned $30,000 first-prize money.

Finals

Singles
 Barbara Potter defeated  Bettina Bunge 6–4, 7–6(7–3)
 It was Potter's first singles title of the year and the 2nd of her career.

Doubles
 Sue Barker /  Ann Kiyomura defeated  Pam Shriver /  Anne Smith	6–2, 7–6(7–5)

Prize money

References

External links
 International Tennis Federation (ITF) tournament edition details

Avon Championships of Cincinnati
Avon Championships of Cincinnati
1982 in sports in Ohio